Si vis pacem, para bellum is a Latin phrase.

Si Vis Pacem, Para Bellum may also refer to the following two albums:

 Si Vis Pacem, Para Bellum (SIC album), 2010
 Si Vis Pacem, Para Bellum (Seether album), 2020